This is a list of devices capable of communicating on an AWS-1 network. AWS-1 (Advanced Wireless Services) is a wireless communication frequency band of the radio spectrum. It is used for transmission of voice, data, video, and messaging over a cellular network. AWS-1 is used in various countries of the Americas. It replaces the spectrum formerly allocated to Multipoint Multichannel Distribution Service (MMDS).

Compatible devices
A partial list of phones, smartphones, tablets and modems that support the AWS-1 frequency on a UMTS network:

Alcatel
 OT-908S
 OT-918S
 OT-981A
 OT-990S
 OT-991
 OT-995
 One Touch Fierce
 One Touch Scribe X
 One Touch Scribe HD-LTE
 Alcatel Pop Icon
 Alcatel M'POP
 Alcatel D3 (Wind Mobile)

Apple
iPhone 5, model A1428
iPhone 5c, models A1436 and A1532
iPhone 5s, models A1453 and A1533
iPhone 6, models A1549 and A1522
iPhone SE (1st generation), models A1662, A1723, A1724
iPad Air, model A1475
iPad mini with Retina Display, model A1490
iPhone 7 and 7 plus purchased in North America

Asus
 Google Nexus 7
 PadFone 2
 Google Nexus 7 (2013)
 Fonepad 7
 ZenFone 2 (WW/TW Firmware phones from Taiwan/China do NOT work on Mobilicity)
 ZenFone 3

BlackBerry
 Q5 (only SQR100-1)
 Q10 (only SQN100-5)
 Z10 (only STL-100-3 (RFK121LW))
 Z30 (only STA-100-5)
 Bold 9700
 Bold 9780
 Bold 9790
 Bold 9900
 Curve 9300
 Curve 9320
 Curve 9360
 Curve 9380
 Pearl 9100
 Torch 9810
 Torch 9860
 BlackBerry Passport
 BlackBerry Classic
 BlackBerry Leap
 DTEK 50
Many of the above listed BlackBerry devices have multiple versions, only one of each being AWS compatible.

BLU
 Quattro 4.5 model D440
 Quattro 4.5 HD model D450
 Quattro 5.7 HD model D460
 Studio 5.0 LTE model Y530Q
 Studio 5.0 II
 Studio Mini LTE
 Studio XL
 Studio 6 HD
 Studio 7 ll
 Win JR (W410U)
 Win HD (W510U)
 Win HD LTE (X150Q)
Energy X 2

Dell
 Venue Pro
 Streak Pro model D43

Garmin
 Nüvifone A50 / Garminfone

HTC
 Google Nexus One
 HTC 8X
 HTC Desire 601
 HTC 8S Wind Mobile version
 HD2
 HD7
 G2
 Amaze
 HTC Flyer (3G version)
 Incredible S
 Maple/Snap
 myTouch 4G/Panache
 One (M7)
 One (M8)
 One (M9)
 One S
 Radar
 Sensation (Z710E only)
 Sensation XE
 T-Mobile Touch Pro2
 T-Mobile G1
 HTC Wildfire S
 HTC EVO 3D

Many of the above listed HTC phones have more than one version. The consumer must ensure that he or she purchases the correct version that supports the AWS frequency.

Huawei
 E138 USB modem
 E173 USB modem
 E181 USB modem
 E1691 USB modem
 E3276 LTE USB modem
 E366 21.6 Mbit/s USB modem
 E372 42 Mbit/s USB modem
 E573 mobile Wi-Fi HotSpot modem (7.2 Mbit/s-down/5.76 Mbit/s-up)
 E583C mobile Wi-Fi HotSpot modem (7.2 Mbit/s-down/5.76 Mbit/s-up)
 E586E mobile Wi-Fi HotSpot modem (21.6 Mbit/s-down/5.76 Mbit/s-up)
 E587 mobile Wi-Fi HotSpot modem (43.2 Mbit/s-down/5.76 Mbit/s-up)
 Ascend D1 Quad XL
 Ascend G312
 Ascend G615
 Ascend Mate
 Ascend P1
 Ascend P1 LTE (only U9202L-3)
 Ascend P6
 Ascend P6S
 Ascend P8
 Ascend W1
 Ascend X
 U1250
 U2801
 U2900
 U3200
 U3220
 U5300
 U6020
 U6150
 U7519 marketed as T-Mobile Tap
 U8100-9
 U8350
 U8500 IDEOS
 U8651T
 U8667
 U8820
 Ascend D1 XL U9500E
 Ascend D quad
 Ascend P1 XL U9200E
 Ascend P1s
 Ascend D quad XL
 Honor 2
 Huawei Ascend Mate
 Ascend Mate2 4G model MT2-L03
 Ascend G6 4G
 T-Mobile myTouch Q 2
 Ascend G7-L03
 GR5W
 Mate 9 (MHA-L29)
 P9 (EVA-DL00)

Lenovo
 K900

LG
 LG V20
 LG G4
 LG G3 (D851 t-mobile version-or D852G)
 LG G2
 C729
 dLite
 F4N
 GU927
 LG Optimus Black
 Optimus 2X (P990)
 T-Mobile G2X (P999) (USA)
 Optimus 3D (P920)
 Optimus 4X HD - P880g (Canada: Wind, Videotron)
 Optimus T
 Sentio
 Google Nexus 4
 Google Nexus 5
 Google Nexus 5X
 LG V909 Tablet
 T-Mobile G-Slate
 Optimus L9 P769
 Optimus F3
 Optimus F6 D500
 Optimus F3Q
 LG G Stylo

Meizu
 MX 2-core
 MX 4-core

Motorola
 Atrix HD
 Charm
 Cliq
 CLIQ XT also known as Quench
 Cliq2
 Defy
 Google Nexus 6
 Master (XT605)
 Motorola Milestone XT720
 Moto G (2013) (US Version)
 Moto G (2014) (US Version)
 Moto X (Developer Edition/T-Mobile)
 Moto X Segunda Genración 2014 XT1097
 Motorola RAZR V
 Motorola XT300 also known as Spice (launched late Dec 2010)
 Motorola Droid Pro Plus only version MB632
 Moto E Dual TV XT1025
 Moto G Dual SIM
 Moto G 3rd Gen XT 1549

Some of the above listed Motorola phones have more than one version, only one of which is AWS compatible.

Nokia
 Asha 302 (RM-884 variant only)
 Asha 303
 Asha 311
 Lumia 520
 Lumia 635 (RM-975 variant only)
 Lumia 710
 Lumia 735 (RM-1039 variant only)
 Lumia 810
 Lumia 920 (RM-820 variant only)
 Lumia 925 (RM-893 variant only)
 Lumia 1020 (RM-876 variant only)
 Lumia 1320 (RM-995 variant only)
 Lumia 1520 (RM-940 variant only)
 3555b (RM-257 only)
 3710
 500
 5230 (RM-593 variant only)
 603
 6263
 700
 701
 808 PureView
 C5-04
 C6-01 (both RM-601 and RM-675)
 C7-00
 E6-00
 E7-00
 E73 Mode
 N8
 N9
 N900
 N950 (developer device)
 X7-00 (RM-707 only)

OnePlus
 One (International Edition, Chinese Edition doesn't work with UMTS Band IV)
 Two (North America model only)
 3/3t (North America model only)

Oppo
 Find 7 (US Version)
 Find 7a (US Version)
 Find 5 (US Version)
 N1

Option
 iCon 452

Samsung
 Samsung Galaxy Note 4 (SM-N910T)
 Samsung Galaxy S III (SGH-T999/T999L/T999V)
 Samsung Galaxy Note II (SGH-T889)
 Samsung Galaxy S4 (T-Mobile USA) (SGH-M919/M919V)
 SCH-R970 Samsung Galaxy S4 (Cricket, C Spire, MetroPCS, U.S. Cellular)
 Samsung Galaxy Note II (SGH-T889/T889V)
 SGH-T899M Ativ S
 Samsung Galaxy S5 (SM-G900T/G900W8)
 Samsung Galaxy Note III (SM-N900T/N900W8)
 Samsung Galaxy S6
 Samsung Galaxy Grand Prime (SM-G530W) (Wind Mobile Canada, T-Mobile USA)
 SGH-T159
 SGH-T259
 SGH-T359 :) Smiley
 SGH-T399 Galaxy Light
 SGH-C414Y and SGH-C414V (FCC ID: A3LSGHC414Y, not A3LSGHC414)
 SGH-T379
 SGH-T469 Gravity 2
 SGH-T479 Gravity 3 (Not the SGH-T479B)
 SGH-T499 Dart
 SGH-T559 Comeback
 T599 Galaxy Exhibit
 SGH-T636 (Cincinnati Bell)
 SGH-T639 Noel* SGH-T659
 SGH-T669 "Gravity T" / "Gravity Touch" (but not the SGH-T669B)
 SGH-T679 Exhibit II 4G (T-Mobile)
 T699 Galaxy S Relay 4G
 SGH-T749 Highlight
 SGH-T759 Exhibit
 T769 Galaxy S Blaze 4G
 SGH-T779 Samsung Galaxy Tab 2 (10.1)
 SGH-T819
 SGH-T839 Sidekick 4G
 T879 Galaxy Note
 SGH-I317M Samsung Galaxy Note II
 SGH-T919 Behold
 SGH-T929 Memoir
 SGH-T939 Behold II
 SGH-T959 Galaxy S "Vibrant"
 SGH-T959V Galaxy S 4G (not SGH-T959P AKA Telus version)
 SGH-T989 Galaxy S II (T-Mobile USA)
 SGH-T989D Galaxy S II X (Telus Canada)
 GT-i9250 Google Galaxy Nexus
 GT-S5603
 Google Nexus S Model GT-I9020T (FCC ID: AL3GTI9020T or A3LGTI9020, not A3L9020A)
 Caliber
 Code
 Freeform
 Freeform II
 Galaxy (i7500)
 Galaxy Q
 Galaxy Tab™
 Stunt
 T369

Social
 X500 - Drive

Sony
 Xperia ion LT28h
 Xperia ion LTE LT28i
 Xperia M - C1904, C2004
 Xperia L - C2104
 Xperia E3 - D2206
 Xperia Acro HD
 Xperia SP - C5302
 Xperia T LT30p
 Xperia T LTE LT30a
 Xperia Z - C6602/C6606
 Xperia Z Ultra
 Xperia ZL - C6502/C6506
 Xperia ZR
 Xperia Z1
 Xperia Z1 Compact
 Xperia Z1s
 Xperia Z2 - D6502/D6503/D6543
 Xperia Z2 Tablet SGP521
 Xperia TX LT29i
 Xperia ZR C5502
 Xperia M2 D2306
 Xperia T2 Ultra D5306
 Xperia Z3 - D6603
 Xperia Z3 Compact
 Xperia Z3 Tablet SGP621

Sony Ericsson
 TM506
 TM717 Equinox
 X10i

Zoom Telephonics
 Zoom 4597 3G+ Freedom Modem

ZTE
 ZTE Anthem
 ZTE Concord
 ZTE MF80
 ZTE MF93E

See also
Advanced Wireless Services
UMTS frequency bands

References

AWS devices